Explosives engineering is the field of science and engineering which is related to examining the behavior and usage of explosive materials.

Topics 
Some of the topics that explosives engineers study, research, and work on include:
 Development and characterization of new explosive materials in various forms
 Analysis of the physical process of detonation
 Explosive generated shock waves and their effects on materials
 Safety testing of explosives
 Analysis and engineering of rock blasting for mining
 Design and analysis of shaped charges and reactive armor
 Design and analysis of military explosives such as shells, aerial bombs, missile warheads, etc.
 Bomb disposal
Drilling and Blasting 
Explosive Manufacturing
Explosives Safety Education and Certification
Drilling Safety Education and Certification
Blasting Safety Education and Certification

Organizations 
Listed in Alphabetical Order:

 Explosives Academy 
 International Society of Explosives Engineers (ISEE)
 Missouri University of Science and Technology 
 New Mexico Institute of Mining and Technology (New Mexico Tech)
 The Academy of Blasting and Explosive Technology

See also 
 Explosives
 Chapman–Jouguet condition
 Chemistry
 Civil engineer
 Chemical engineer
 Gurney equations
 Material science
 Physics
 Rock Blasting

References

External links 
 http://www.isee.org/
 http://www.explosivesacademy.org/